Black Muslims and Black Islam denote any black people who are Muslim. This term may be used in reference to:

African-American Muslims
Islam in Africa
Islam in the African diaspora

Historically, the term was specifically used in reference to black nationalist organizations that describe themselves as Muslim. Some of these groups are not considered Muslim by adherents of mainstream Islam. These organizations include:

Nation of Islam
Moorish Science Temple of America
United Nation of Islam
Five-Percent Nation
Nuwaubian Nation
American Society of Muslims

See also
Islam in the United States